Little Wild One is the sixth studio album by Joan Osborne released under Saguaro Road Records on September 9, 2008. On this album she was assisted again by producers/writers Rob Hyman, Eric Bazilian, and Rick Chertoff who also worked with her on her breakthrough album Relish. The album was recorded at Elm Street Studios and Red Door Recording.

The first single was "Sweeter Than the Rest".

Osborne toured to support her newest album, beginning on September 25 at the Music Hall in Williamsburg, Brooklyn.

Track listing

Credits
Mastered by George Marino 
Producers – Eric Bazilian, Rick Chertoff, Rob Hyman

References

External links
 Official Page
 

Joan Osborne albums
2008 albums
Albums produced by Rob Hyman
Albums produced by Rick Chertoff
Albums produced by Eric Bazilian